Christianity is the predominant religion in Solomon Islands, with Anglicanism (Church of Melanesia) being the single largest denomination.

The constitution of Solomon Islands establishes the freedom of religion, and this freedom is respected in practice by both the government and general society.

Demographics 

Religious makeup of the population of Solomon Islands as of 2007:
Christianity 92%
Protestant 73%
 Anglican Church of Melanesia 35%
 South Seas Evangelical Church 17%
 United Church in Papua New Guinea and Solomon Islands 11%
 Seventh-day Adventist Church 10%
 Catholic Church 19%
Animism 5%
Other 3%

An estimated 5 percent of the population, consisting primarily of the Kwaio community on the island of Malaita, practice indigenous animistic religions. Groups that together constitute less than 5 percent of the population include the Ahmadiyya Muslim Community and other Muslims, the Baháʼí Faith, Jehovah's Witnesses, the Church of Jesus Christ of Latter-day Saints (Mormons), Unification Church, and indigenous churches that have broken away from the major Christian denominations. There are believed to be members of other religious groups within the foreign community who were free to practice, but they are not known to proselytize or hold public religious ceremonies. According to the most recent reports, there are approximately 350 Muslims.

Christianity was brought to the country in the 19th and early 20th centuries by missionaries representing several Western denominations. Some foreign missionaries continue to work in the country. Except for the Roman Catholic Church, whose clergy is approximately 45 percent foreign, the clergy of the established churches is nearly entirely indigenous.

Religious freedom 
The constitution of Solomon Islands establishes the freedom of religion, although it also allows for this freedom to be curtailed when "reasonably required" by other laws.

All religious organizations are required to register with the government.

The public school curriculum includes an hour of optional weekly religious education, with the content determined by the Solomon Islands Christian Association. Non-christian religious instruction is available by request. The government subsidizes schools and health centers operated by religious organizations, in addition to providing small grants to religious organizations.

Leaders of minority groups in Solomon Islands have reported no incidents of religious discrimination as of 2017.

See also

Roman Catholicism in Solomon Islands
Islam in Solomon Islands

References